Bonnie Prince Charlie is a 1948 British historical film directed by Anthony Kimmins for London Films depicting the 1745 Jacobite Rebellion and the role of Bonnie Prince Charlie within it. Filmed in Technicolor, it stars David Niven, Jack Hawkins, and Margaret Leighton.

Plot
In 1745, Flora MacDonald plays a Jacobite song on the piano and is scolded by her stepfather for its seditious nature. In Italy, James, the Old Pretender, wants to make another attempt at regaining the throne of Great Britain (Scotland and England) and Ireland for the House of Stuart from the Hanoverian King George II, but, thinking that he is now too old, he has decided to send his son, Charles Edward, the Young Pretender.

Charles arrives in Scotland by ship and meets Donald, a Scottish shepherd, whom he asks to send a message to the Scottish nobles, asking them to meet him at his ship. Meanwhile, King George II is warned about the impending invasion but is not worried. Charles tries to persuade the nobles to fight for him and most agree, except for Lord MacDonald, who is concerned about the absence of the French support which had been promised. The clans rally to Charles, including Lord George Murray, and proclaim their loyalty to James. The rebellion begins. Charles is accompanied by another shepherd, Blind Jimmie.

Charles and his men enter Edinburgh in triumph. Clementina Walkinshaw throws him a rose and they meet at a dance and begin a romance. General Cope arrives with government troops and Lord Murray does not want to tell Charles about it, thinking little of his military ability, but the prince finds out. Charles recommends they attack and the Jacobite forces rapidly defeat the Government forces at the Battle of Prestonpans.

Charles and his forces then proceed into England. King George II starts to panic and sends his son, the Duke of Cumberland, to fight him. At Derby, only 127 miles from London, Lord Murray and the army council recommend a retreat, as further support has failed to materialise. Charles opposes this but the retreat goes ahead. Charles is upset and seeks solace with Clementina, who encourages him to leave for France with her, but he elects to stay with his men.

The Duke of Cumberland defeats the Highlanders at the Battle of Culloden but is unable to find and capture Charles. Charles flees to the islands with Donald, and is hidden by Flora MacDonald. MacDonald helps him evade the government troops looking for him, including taking him with her to Skye disguised as a woman servant. MacDonald keeps up Charles' spirits, and he manages to reach the boat sent to take him back to Italy.

Cast
 David Niven as Bonnie Prince Charlie
 Margaret Leighton as Flora MacDonald
 Morland Graham as Donald MacDonald
 John Laurie as Blind Jimmie
 Jack Hawkins as Lord George Murray
 Judy Campbell as Clementina Walkinshaw
 Ronald Adam as Macleod
 Charles Goldner as Captain Ferguson
 Elwyn Brook-Jones as Duke of Cumberland
 Finlay Currie as Marquis of Tullibardine
 Herbert Lomas as Kinloch Moidart
 Hector Ross as Glenalandale
 John Longden as Colonel O'Sullivan
 Franklin Dyall as Macdonald
 Guy Le Feuvre as Cameron of Lochiel
 Stuart Lindsell as MacDonald of Armadale
 James Hayter as Kingsburgh
 Martin Miller as King George II
 G. H. Mulcaster as The Duke of Newcastle
 Torin Thatcher as Colonel Kor
 Hugh Kelly as Lieutenant Ingleby
 Henry Oscar as The Old Pretender

Production

Development
In April 1936 Leslie Howard announced he wanted to make a film about Bonnie Prince Charlie. Two years later he said he would make it with Alexander Korda after his films of Lawrence of Arabia and Lord Nelson. "I am so in love with the story of Charles Edward that I would not undertake it unless I had time to adequately prepare and complete it", said Howard.  Plans to make the film were delayed by World War II, in which Howard was killed.  After the war Alexander Korda announced a Bonnie Prince Charlie project. Michael Powell was originally named as the director. Then in April it was announced that Leslie Arliss would direct and Ted Black would be borrowed from MGM to produce. No star was cast in the lead; the only person cast at all was Kieron Moore who would play Charlie's Irish adjutant.

David Niven became a front runner to play the part. He was a friend of Howard's before the latter's death. David Niven's casting was formally announced in May. At the time, David Niven said that he was keen to make the film as it gave him the chance to return to England, and he did not enjoy being in Hollywood after the death of his first wife. He was so enthusiastic he did a screen test in costume to persuade Samuel Goldwyn, who had Niven under contract, to loan him out to Alexander Korda, who was producing the film. Later on, however, Niven alleged he had been forced by Goldwyn to take the role. It was one of the few roles Niven played in his career without his moustache. He says Goldwyn received $150,000 from Korda for his services, although Niven only got a fraction of that.

Norman Ginsbury and Elizabeth Montgomery wrote the original script.

Location shooting
Filming took place on location in Scotland and at Shepperton Studios in London. Second unit filming began in August 1946 near Fort William. Doubles for the main cast were used as David Niven was unavailable until the spring. The budget was reported then as being £500,000. Doubles and extra were filmed raising the standard at Glenfinnan. Soldiers in the British Army were hired as extras, but complained they were not paid.

In March 1947 it was announced Robert Stevenson would be directing. Niven did not arrive in London until July 1947.

Korda's original choice to play Flora MacDonald was Deborah Kerr, but she had accepted a Hollywood contract and was unavailable for filming. Stage actor Margaret Leighton was cast instead. C. Aubrey Smith was meant to be in a supporting role but filming took so long to start he ended up returning to Hollywood.

Shooting
Filming finally began in August 1947. By now the script was by Clemence Dane and was to be in two parts, The Story about the '45, and The Legend about Charlie fleeing from the British.

Filming took over nine months. Stevenson resigned as director and was replaced by Anthony Kimmins. Kimmins also quit the film and was replaced by Korda himself. In November 1947 Ted Black walked off the film.

Will Fyffe collapsed during filming and was taken hospital;  his scenes had to be re-shot with Morland Graham playing his part at an estimated cost of $100,000. Fyffe later died.

Niven later recalled the film without affection:
Bonnie Prince Charlie was one of those huge, florid extravaganzas that reek of disaster from the start. There was never a completed screenplay, and never during the eight months we were shooting were the writers more than two days ahead of the actors. In confusion we suffered three changes of directors, with Korda himself desperately taking over, and at one point I cabled Goldwyn: "I have now worked every day for five months on this picture and nobody can tell me how story ends. Advise." He didn't. He didn't even bother to answer. I loved Alex Korda, a brilliant, generous creature, but with this film he was wallowing in confusion. I felt sorry for him, but sorrier for myself as the Bonnie Prince who would assuredly bear the blame for the impending debacle.
However, Niven did meet his second wife during filming.

Reception
The film formed part of a pattern for film portrayal of true life tragic historical figures. However the overall theme would have little grass roots sympathy in Scotland and none whatsoever in England . It had its world premiere in Edinburgh in October 1948, reflecting its limited appeal.

The film was poorly received by London film critics, most criticising it as dull and suggesting that David Niven was miscast. However, Margaret Leighton received acclaim for her performance. Variety called it "long ponderous and often boring".

Alex Korda took out paid advertisements defending the film and criticising the critics.

The film failed to recoup its cost at the box office.

Producer Edward Black died not long after the premiere.

US release
20th Century Fox agreed to distribute in the US.

The film's US release was held back, along with other Korda productions, out of fear of anti-British protests from American-Jewish groups opposed to British policy in Palestine. The film was finally released in the US in 1952.

Home media

The film was released on DVD on 14 March 2011.

References

External links

Review of film at Variety
Article from Sunday Herald, February 2013

1948 films
British biographical films
Films directed by Anthony Kimmins
Jacobite rising of 1745 films
Fiction set in 1745
Fiction set in 1746
Charles Edward Stuart
Films produced by Alexander Korda
1940s biographical films
1940s English-language films
1940s British films